The 2009-10 St. Cloud State Huskies women's ice hockey season saw the team coached by Jeff Giesen. Giesen was assisted by Jennifer Kranz, Jason Johnson, and Ian Andersen, and the strength and conditioning coach was Travis Zins. During this season, Felicia Nelson became the first Huskies player to be a Top 10 finalist for the Patty Kazmaier Award. The club had a 15-14-8 overall
record and an 11-11-6 mark in the WCHA. The team finished the season in third place. This was the first time in school and league history that St. Cloud State was one of
the top three schools in the standings.

Offseason
September 9: The WCHA announced that St. Cloud State goaltender Ashley Nixon, defenseman Danielle Hirsch and forwards Caitlin Hogan and Holly Roberts were named as WCHA All-Stars. The four players were among 22 players from the conference to face the 2009–10 United States women's national ice hockey team in St. Paul, Minn. on September 25.

Exhibition

Regular season
Oct 30-31: Meaghan Pezon scored two goals and assisted on two other for four points in the first game of the series (Oct. 30) versus North Dakota. It was a new personal career-high points total in a single game for Pezon. On Oct. 31, Pezon came back to produce assists on each of St. Cloud State's first two goals in a 3-2 victory over the Sioux. It was the team's first league win of the season.

Standings

Roster

Schedule
St. Cloud will compete in the Easton Holiday Showcase from January 2–3.

Player stats

Skaters

Goaltenders

Awards and honors
 Caitlin Hogan,  Patty Kazmaier Award nominee
 Caitlin Hogan, WCHA Student Athlete of the Year
 Caitlin Hogan, Frozen Four Skills Competition participant
 Felicia Nelson, Patty Kazmaier Award nominee
Felicia Nelson, WCHA Offensive Player of the Week (Week of January 4)
Felicia Nelson, Co-WCHA Player of the Year 
Felicia Nelson, 2010 Women's RBK Hockey Division I All-America Second Team 
Ashley Nixon, WCHA Co-Defensive Players of the Week (Week of January 20)
Meaghan Pezon, WCHA Offensive Player of the Week (Week of November 2)

References

External links
Official site

Saint Cloud State
St. Cloud State Huskies women's ice hockey seasons
2009 in sports in Minnesota
2010 in sports in Minnesota